Oliver Kragl (born 12 May 1990) is a German professional footballer who plays as a midfielder for Italian  club Messina.

Career
Kragl made and scored on his professional debut for Eintracht Braunschweig during the 2009–10 3. Liga season in a 2–1 home win over FC Ingolstadt 04. He made 16 appearances for Braunschweig during his debut season, scoring two goals. Due to injury problems, Kragl only made one further appearance for the club during the 2010–11 season and subsequently left Braunschweig in the summer of 2011 to join Regionalliga side VfB Germania Halberstadt.

In June 2013, Kragl joined Austrian Bundesliga side SV Ried. He made his league debut on 20 July 2013 in a 0–0 draw with SV Grödig. He scored his first goal in the league on 3 August 2013 in a 3–3 draw against Austria Wien. The goal came in the 80th minute.

During the winter break of the 2015–16 season, he transferred to Italian club Frosinone. He made his league debut on 10 January 2016 in a 5–1 loss against Napoli. He was replaced by Raman Chibsah in the 62nd minute. He scored his first goal for the club in a 3–3 away draw to Milan on 1 May 2016.

On 5 July 2017, Kragl was signed by Crotone. He made his league debut on 27 August 2017 in a 0–0 draw with Hellas Verona. He was brought on in the 68th minute, replacing Adrian Stoian.

In January 2018 he moved to Serie B side Foggia on loan. He made his league debut on 20 January 2018 in a 1–0 loss to Pescara. His first goal for the club came just a week later in a 2–1 win over Virtus Entella. His goal, assisted by Leandro Greco, came in the 32nd minute. On 19 June 2018, Foggia exercised the option to make the transfer permanent. 

Following Foggia's bankruptcy, on 16 July 2019 Kragl signed a three-year contract with Serie B club Benevento.

On 5 October 2020 he joined Serie B club Ascoli on loan. On 31 August 2021, his contract with Benevento was terminated by mutual consent.

On 2 February 2022, Kragl signed a contract with Avellino in Serie C until 30 June 2022, with automatic extension in case of promotion to Serie B.

After spending the first half of the 2022–23 season with SV Ried in Austria, on 11 January 2023 Kragl returned to Italy, joining Serie C club Messina.

Career statistics

Club

Honours
Benevento
 Serie B: 2019–20

References

External links 
 
 

1990 births
Living people
People from Wolfsburg
Footballers from Lower Saxony
German footballers
Association football midfielders
3. Liga players
Regionalliga players
Oberliga (football) players
Austrian Football Bundesliga players
Serie A players
Serie B players
Serie C players
VfL Wolfsburg players
Eintracht Braunschweig II players
Eintracht Braunschweig players
VfB Germania Halberstadt players
SV Babelsberg 03 players
SV Ried players
Frosinone Calcio players
F.C. Crotone players
Calcio Foggia 1920 players
Benevento Calcio players
Ascoli Calcio 1898 F.C. players
U.S. Avellino 1912 players
A.C.R. Messina players
German expatriate footballers
German expatriate sportspeople in Austria
Expatriate footballers in Austria
German expatriate sportspeople in Italy
Expatriate footballers in Italy